NGC 5793 is an active spiral galaxy located approximately 150 million light years away in the constellation Libra. It is classified as a Type 2 Seyfert galaxy and was discovered by Francis Leavenworth in 1886. The galactic plane is inclined at an angle of 73°, giving it an oval, nearly edge-on appearance with the major axis aligned along a position angle of 150°.

Seyfert galaxies such as NGC 5793 are known to house megamasers. Megamasers can have a luminosity of thousands of times greater than the Sun. Neutral hydrogen has been detected against the galactic nucleus. This means that NGC 5793 has an estimated HI cloud size of ≈15 pc and an estimated atomic gas density of ≈200 cm -3.

References

External links
 

Spiral galaxies
Seyfert galaxies
5793
Libra (constellation)